BlackArch is a penetration testing distribution based on Arch Linux that provides a large amount of cyber security tools. It is an open-source distro created specially for penetration testers and security researchers. The repository contains more than 2800 tools that can be installed individually or in groups. BlackArch Linux is compatible with existing Arch Linux installs.

Overview 

BlackArch is similar in usage to both Parrot OS and Kali Linux when fully installed, with a major difference being BlackArch is based on Arch Linux instead of Debian. 

BlackArch only provides the Xfce desktop environment in the "Slim ISO" but provides multiple preconfigured Window Managers in the "Full ISO". 

Similar to Kali Linux and Parrot OS, BlackArch can be burned to an ISO image and run as a live system. BlackArch can also be installed as an unofficial user repository on any current Arch Linux installation.

Packages 

BlackArch currently contains 2841 packages and tools, along with their dependencies. BlackArch is developed by a small number of cyber security specialists and researchers that add the packages as well as dependencies needed to run these tools.

Tools categories within the BlackArch distribution (Counting date: 9 June 2022):

 blackarch-anti-forensic: 2 tools
 blackarch-automation: 106 tools
 blackarch-automobile: 3 tools
 blackarch-backdoor: 47 tools
 blackarch-binary: 68 tools
 blackarch-bluetooth: 25 tools
 blackarch-code-audit: 29 tools
 blackarch-cracker: 166 tools
 blackarch-crypto: 74 tools
 blackarch-database: 6 tools
 blackarch-debugger: 16 tools
 blackarch-decompiler: 17 tools
 blackarch-defensive: 45 tools
 blackarch-disassembler: 19 tools
 blackarch-dos: 30 tools
 blackarch-drone: 4 tools
 blackarch-exploitation: 180 tools
 blackarch-fingerprint: 30 tools
 blackarch-firmware: 4 tools
 blackarch-forensic: 124 tools
 blackarch-fuzzer: 84 tools
 blackarch-hardware: 6 tools
 blackarch-honeypot: 16 tools
 blackarch-ids: 1 tool
 blackarch-keylogger: 3 tools
 blackarch-malware: 33 tools
 blackarch-misc: 134 tools
 blackarch-mobile: 43 tools
 blackarch-networking: 167 tools
 blackarch-nfc: 1 tool
 blackarch-packer: 2 tools
 blackarch-proxy: 35 tools
 blackarch-radio: 14 tools
 blackarch-recon: 235 tools
 blackarch-reversing: 42 tools
 blackarch-scanner: 304 tools
 blackarch-sniffer: 46 tools
 blackarch-social: 59 tools
 blackarch-spoof: 16 tools
 blackarch-stego: 11 tools
 blackarch-tunnel: 26 tools
 blackarch-voip: 22 tools
 blackarch-webapp: 299 tools
 blackarch-windows: 130 tools
 blackarch-wireless: 82 tools
 Checker: 1 tool
 Find Advanced Information on a Username, Website, Phone Number, etc: 1 tool
 Uncategorized tools: 3 tools; didier-stevens-suite, python-search-engine-parser, python-yara-rednaga

References

External links 

 Official website
 BlackArch Installation and development Guide
 BlackArch Linux downloads
BlackArch DistroWatch page

Linux security software
Pentesting software toolkits
Rolling Release Linux distributions
Security testing tools
X86-64 Linux distributions
Linux distributions